Erçetin is a surname. Notable people with the surname include:

Aykut Erçetin (born 1982), Turkish footballer
Candan Erçetin (born 1963), Turkish singer and songwriter

See also
Candan Erçetin discography
Remix (Candan Erçetin album), Candan Erçetin album

Turkish-language surnames